Robert Calhoun may refer to:
 Bob Calhoun, member of the Virginia Senate
 Robert Calhoun (producer), American TV producer